James Yami Lester  (1941 – 21 July 2017) was a Yankunytjatjara man, an Indigenous person of northern South Australia. Lester, who survived nuclear testing in outback Australia, is best known as an anti-nuclear and indigenous rights advocate.

Maralinga nuclear testing

Lester was born at Walytjatjata in the Anangu Pitjantjatjara Yankunytjatjara Lands of South Australia in 1941.

In the 1950s, while still a young boy, he was blinded by a "black mist" from the south.

After the mist passed, his family's camp experienced sudden deaths, outbreaks of skin rashes, vomiting, diarrhoea and temporary and permanent blindness. Yami has said that some of the people were so weak they could not get down to the nearby waterhole and skim the black scum off the water which came from the black cloud, and actually died of thirst. It is generally accepted that this black mist was fallout from British nuclear tests at Maralinga and Emu Junction which were taking place at that time.

His most significant contribution to the rights of Aboriginal people was helping gain recognition for the atomic tests at Maralinga and an acknowledgement for the 1800 Aboriginal people affected.

His actions helped lead to the McClelland Royal Commission in 1985, which found significant radiation hazards still existed at the Maralinga test sites. Recommendations included group compensation for the Maralinga Tjarutja people and an extensive, long-term cleanup operation to restore the land.

Other activism
As a young man, he joined the Aboriginal Advancement League in Adelaide, but he wanted to take more direct action, in the manner of Charles Perkins, probably the most prominent Indigenous activist at that time.

He began work for the United Mission, in Alice Springs, as a welfare worker and interpreter for the courts. He later became involved in the Institute of Aboriginal Development which was concerned with Aboriginal education and language. Lester took a great interest in cross-cultural issues and programs.

After a position administering business affairs for the  Mimili community, Lester worked with the Pitjantjatjara Land Council on Aboriginal lands rights issues with the South Australian Government. He worked as an organiser and interpreter assisting the handover of freehold title to the Anangu people in 1981, which came about as a result of the Pitjantjatjara Land Rights Act, (SA).

Personal life
Lester had three children: Rosemary, Leroy and Karina, a translator and activist.

He retired to his traditional home at Walatina Station near Marla in the far north of South Australia. He died on 21 July 2017 in Alice Springs at the age of 75. The passing of Yami Lester was a sad event for the Aboriginal community but his legacy and impact still lives on in through the lives of his relatives, this includes Kate Lester. The prime minister of Australia, Malcolm Turnbull paid tribute to Lester describing him as "one of the most significant Aboriginal leaders our country has known".

See also
 British nuclear tests at Maralinga
 McClelland Royal Commission

References

1941 births
2017 deaths
Australian anti–nuclear weapons activists
Australian indigenous rights activists
Blind activists
Recipients of the Medal of the Order of Australia